Amalgam most commonly refers to:
 Amalgam (chemistry), mercury alloy
 Amalgam (dentistry), material of silver tooth fillings
 Bonded amalgam, used in dentistry

Amalgam may also refer to:

 Amalgam Comics, a publisher
 Amalgam Digital, an independent record label in Boston, Massachusetts
 Amalgam, Gauteng, South Africa
 Amalgam, a fictional organization in Full Metal Panic!: The Second Raid
 "Amalgam", a track from the soundtrack of the 2015 video game Undertale by Toby Fox

See also
 Amalgamation (disambiguation)